Cloonan is a surname. Notable people with the surname include:

Becky Cloonan (born 1980), American comic book creator
Diarmuid Cloonan (born 1980), Irish hurler, brother of Eugene
Eugene Cloonan (born 1978), Irish hurler
Jarlath Cloonan (born 1953), Irish hurler